"Guitar Song" is a single released by Scottish band Texas, taken from their greatest hits album The Greatest Hits. It contains a sample of the song "Je t'aime... moi non plus" performed by Serge Gainsbourg and Jane Birkin. The song was released in 2001 exclusively in Belgium, where it charted inside the top 50 in both Flanders and Wallonia.

Track listing

CD single (568 910-2)
 "Guitar Song" (album version) — 3:55
 "Guitar Song" (live) — 5:01

Credits

 Mixed by — Ash Howes
 Produced by — Johnny Mac
 Written by — Johnny McElhone, Sharleen Spiteri, Serge Gainsbourg

Chart performance

References

Texas (band) songs
2000 songs
2001 singles
Songs written by Sharleen Spiteri
Songs written by Johnny McElhone
Songs written by Serge Gainsbourg